Angel Chiang (born November 10, 1989) is a Hong Kong actress contracted to TVB.

Career
Angel Chiang went to school at Yan Chai Hospital Lim Por Yen Secondary School. In 2007, she became a TVB artiste after entering the TVbeople talent competition, being the only female artiste of the eight to be given artiste contracts by TVB. Since joining TVB, Chiang has played many supporting roles and being cast in five series as the younger versions of older established TVB actresses. The most prominent of these roles was as the young Yip Chi Yan in the 2011 drama When Heaven Burns. 

Chiang received her first major role in the 2012 sitcom Come Home Love. In 2013, she took on her first female leading role in the film A Secret Between Us. Chiang garnered attention with her role in the 2020 comedy drama Al Cappuccino. She gained recognition by winning the Most Improved Female Artiste award at the 2020 TVB Anniversary Awards. In 2022, she received attention again with her villainous role in the drama The War of Beauties.
, eventually winning the TVB Anniversary Award for Best Supporting Actress.

Chiang is best friend with Tracy Chu, Roxanne Tong, Jennifer Shum and Kayi Cheung.

Filmography

TV dramas

Films
 I Love Hong Kong (2011)
 The Fortune Buddies (2011)
 A Secret Between Us (2013)
 The Best Plan is No Plan (2013)

References

External links
Official TVB artiste profile(Chinese)

1989 births
Living people
Hong Kong film actresses
Hong Kong television presenters
Hong Kong women television presenters
Hong Kong female models
TVB actors
People from Shenzhen
Actresses from Guangdong